The 2015–16 MDFA Elite Division is the top-tier football in the Indian city of Mumbai. This is the 103rd season of the league. It was started from 14 September 2015. Air India FC are the defending champions. 14 teams participated in the league. All the matches were played at Cooperage Football Ground. ONGC F.C were crowned as champions while Mumbai F.C were runners up.

Teams

League table

Statistics

Source: Football Masala website

Top scorers

References

M
M